Minimerg is the untouched valley of the District Astore in the Pakistani region of Gilgit-Baltistan. Due to close proximity to the LOC (Line of Control), limited civilian tourists are allowed.

Villages 
There are two villages in the valley of Minimerg: Domail and Kamri

Location 
Minimerg valley is located at the extreme end of the Astore District towards Azad Kashmir. To its east is the Kargil, to the north lies the town of Astore, to the west is Azad Kashmir (Neelum Valley) and to the south is the Indian held Kashmir. The valley connects city of Gilgit-Baltistan to Azad Kashmir via a foot track.

Routes 
The entrance to Miminerg is through Astore from Gilgit’s side and from famous Deosei Plains from Sakardu side. It goes downhill from Burzil pass which is located at the height of 14000 feet at sea level. This land is decorated with the grass slopes, thick pine forests, fertile fields and blue water streams. In winter it is covered with white sheet of snow, with no accessibility from November to May each year. In summers it is heaven on earth with lush green grasslands and tiny colorful flowers that are spread like a carpet.

Population 
This area is scarcely populated due to severe winter season. The population of the valley is not more than 3000. The inhabitants grow crops in summer season.

Wildlife 
The valley has diverse fauna and wildlife including Himalayan bears, snow leopards, snow fox, markhor, chakoor and marmot.

This is page content.

Valleys of Gilgit-Baltistan